List of Doc Savage novels is a comprehensive list of the books written about the fictional character originally published in American pulp magazines during the 1930s and 1940s. He was created by publisher Henry W. Ralston and editor John L. Nanovic at Street & Smith Publications, with additional material contributed by the series' main writer, Lester Dent. The illustrations were by Walter Baumhofer, Paul Orban, Emery Clarke, Modest Stein, and Robert G. Harris.

Description
Doc Savage stories, 213 in total, first appeared in Conde Nast's Doc Savage Magazine pulps. The original series has sold over 20 million copies in paperback form. The first entry was The Man of Bronze, in March, 1933 from the house name "Kenneth Robeson".  John L. Nanovic was editor for 10 years, and planned and approved all story outlines.  The early stories were pure pulp "supersagas", as dubbed by Philip Jose Farmer, with rampaging dinosaurs and lost races, secret societies led by dastardly villains, fantastic gadgets and weapons, autogyros and zeppelins, death-dealing traps and hair-raising escapes, and plots to rule the earth.  In the first few stories, Doc and his aides killed enemies without compunction.  An editorial decision made them kill only when necessary for a more adventurous kid-friendly magazine, unlike the bloodthirsty competitor The Shadow.

Doc Savage was the lead story, often illustrated with line drawings.  Exciting covers were painted in bold colors by Walter M. Baumhofer.  Other adventure stories filled up the back, and there was a letters column.  Kids could join the Doc Savage Club complete with badge, or follow "The Doc Savage Method Of Self-development" to build muscle and memory.  In Depression America, 10-cent pulps with hundred of pages were handed around barracks or bunkhouses or schoolyards, a popular form of entertainment when people were unemployed and poor, and fantastic stories were a pleasant diversion from real life.  Lester Dent wrote most of the stories, with fill-ins by Harold A. Davis, Alan Hathway, and William Bogart that were overseen or rewritten by Dent.

By 1938, as the economy improved, pulps were on the wane and faced competition from comic books.  During World War II, ordinary men and women performed fantastic deeds daily in exotic corners of the world, and fantastic pulp adventures seemed childish.   Charles Moran became editor in 1943 and changed the format to suspense and realism.  Doc used fewer gadgets and standard detective tropes.  By 1946, in Measures for a Coffin, Doc is busting crooked investment bankers.  Doc pared down his team, working mainly with Monk and Ham, and sometimes alone.  Successive editors carried this format, and Babette Rosmond retitled the magazine Doc Savage, Science Detective in 1947.

By this time, the Doc stories were shorter than other stories in the magazine.  Covers rarely showed Doc anymore, becoming detective-generic, abstract or illustrating non-Doc stories.  Dent may have recycled some generic detective stories as Doc tales; King Joe Cay features Doc working alone, in disguise, with no aides, gadgets, or headquarters, and an interest in the ladies.  Alan Hathway's grisly The Mindless Monsters reads like a rejected Spider story.  Experimenting with new formats, during 1947 Dent wrote five stories with a first-person narrator, an innocent person caught up in a Doc Savage adventure, with one story narrated by Pat Savage, I Died Yesterday.  Still, sales fell.

The magazine went bi-monthly in 1947, then quarterly in 1949.  Editor William de Grouchy was brought back to revive the magazine, and asked Dent to return to larger-than-life stories.  Dent took a new direction, with Doc infiltrating Russia and outwitting "the Ivans".  This story, eventually titled The Red Spider in the Bantam run, was killed and shelved by editor Daisy Bacon.  She oversaw three pulp-style adventures for the last three issues, but the magazine was cancelled in 1949.  In the last story, Up from Earth's Center, Doc delves into a cave in Maine and meets what may be actual demons, and runs screaming in terror.  The saga had ended.

Until 1964, when Bantam Books revived the pulps as paperbacks.  A huge selling point were the striking photo-realistic covers of a vibrant, widow-peaked, shredded-shirted Doc painted by James Bama and later Bob Larkin, Boris Vallejo, and others.  Bantam reprinted all the stories, concluding in 1990, but not in the original publication order, and a few stories were retitled.  They started as single volumes with numbers.  As the stories got shorter, Bantam combined double novels with numbers, and finally Doc Savage Omnibuses with four or five stories without numbers.   The rejected The Red Spider manuscript was discovered in 1975 by Will Murray and published during the Bantam Books print run as #95.

In recent years, Anthony Tollin's Sanctum Books, initially in association with Nostalgia Ventures for the first 16 releases, has reprinted all 182 (including the initially unpublished The Red Spider) of the Doc Savage stories from the thirties and forties, usually at least two to a volume, using Baumhofer covers, and some Bama covers for variant editions. The reprint project, 87 volumes in total, was completed in 2016.

Doc Savage Magazine (1933)

Doc Savage Magazine (1975)
Magazine Management Co, Inc, a Marvel imprint also called Curtis Magazines, published eight black-and-white illustrated magazines as a movie tie-in.  The cover of the first issue was an elaboration of the poster for the 1975 film Doc Savage: The Man of Bronze painted by Roger Kastel, with all of the other covers painted by Ken Barr.  So, for eight issues, a Doc Savage magazine reappeared on newsstands.  The stories were reprinted in Showcase Presents: Doc Savage and again as Doc Savage Archives: Vol 1.

Doc Savage Novels

The list includes original Doc Savage novels either entirely new or developed from Lester Dent's stories and notes.

References

Further reading

External links
 Doc Savage books at Faded Page (Canada)

 
Novel series
Lists of novels
Superhero novels